Edgar C. Otálvora (born Edgar Omar Contreras Otálvora; September 6, 1959 in Tovar, Mérida State, Venezuela) is a Venezuelan intellectual, journalist, and politician who has held government and diplomatic positions. He is an expert in international politics and economics, and has distinguished himself as an analyst of Latin American topics, with a focus on military, diplomatic, and political issues. He has been a columnist in Venezuelans and Americans newspapers, in addition to directing the newspaper  El Nuevo Pais
in Caracas from 2006 to 2010. He is a professor at the Central University of Venezuela. He was a close collaborator of former Venezuelan president Ramón J. Velásquez. He has cultivated the biographical genre, being the first to write biographies of the 19th century Venezuelan presidents Raimundo Andueza Palacio and Juan Pablo Rojas Paul, as well as the Colombian president Virgilio Barco Vargas. Columnist in Diario Las Américas of Miami.

Public career 
He obtained a bachelor's degree in Economics from the University of the Andes, Venezuela in 1982 and in 2003 was awarded a master's degree in History of the Americas. He has taught at the School of International Studies and the graduate History of the Americas program at the Central University of Venezuela.
In 1990, he was named Executive Secretary of the Presidential Committee for Colombian-Venezuelan Border Issues (COPAF). In 1993 he began the role of General Director of the Ministry of the Secretariat of the Presidency, alongside Ramón J. Velásquez, who would be declared president by the National Congress after a case was opened against then-president Carlos Andrés Pérez. From 1994 to 1999 he was Chief of the Political Departments of the Venezuelan embassies in Bogotá and Brasilia, as well as Consul General in Belém do Pará, Brazil. He has been a consultant and advisor for Hewlett-Packard NCA Latin America, and the Friedrich Ebert Foundation.

Journalism career 
His journalism career began in 1980 as a columnist for the Diario Frontera in Mérida. He was part of the writing team of the Revista AZUL of the University of the Andes  . His opinion columns were first published in 1982 in the newspaper El Nacional in Caracas and, soon after, in the newspaper El Universal as a critic in the Cultural Pages directed by Sofía Imber. In the mid-1990s, he directed the magazine Venezuela en Colombia, edited in Bogotá. Specializing in topics in Latin American politics, he wrote the column  Mirando el Vecindario  (Looking Around the Neighborhood) in the newspaper El Mundo from 2004 to 2006. Upon taking the role of director of the newspaper El Nuevo País, he began production of  Informe Otálvora, appearing in numerous online publications in Latin America.
Editor of the news web portal Noticias Clic since 2011. Columnist in Diario Las Américas of Miami since March 2014.

Books and Academic Articles 
 Venezuela Juego Trancado (2020) ASIN B08Q324J98 - 
 De Caracas a Brasilia 46 años in Brasil:cercano y lejano (Edmundo González Urrutia. Coordinator. Caracas. Instituto de Estudios Parlamentario Fermín Toro - UCAB. 2019) 
Venezuela un problema global- Ebook. (2019) 
Venezolanos en Fuga- Ebook. (2014) 
La Década Roja de América Latina. Ebook. (2013) 
 CASTRO & CHAVEZ  (English edition) (2011) 
Un Barco Liberal (2011). (Biography of Virgilio Barco Vargas) 
Cooperación, integración o fusión militar en Suramérica (Cooperation, integration or merging of the armed forces in South America) in "Venezuela en el contexto de la seguridad regional" (Caracas, ILDIS, 2007)
Retos y perspectivas de la integración energética en América Latina.(Coauthor). Kart-Peter Schütt y Flavio Carucci (Coordinators). (Caracas, ILDIS - Fundación Friedriech Ebert, 2007)
Raimundo Andueza Palacio. (Biography).(Caracas, Biblioteca Biográfica Venezolana-Diario El Nacional, 2006). Digital Edition: 
Aproximación a la agenda de seguridad de Venezuela con Brasil. (Approach to the security of Venezuela with Brazil agenda) (Caracas, ILDIS - Fundación Friedriech Ebert, 2005)
Juan Pablo Rojas Paúl. (Biography).(Caracas, Biblioteca Biográfica Venezolana-Diario El Nacional, 2005. Digital Edition:
La Crisis de la Corbeta Caldas. (The Crisis of the Corvette Caldas). (Caracas, Editorial Pomaire, 2003). Includes biographies of the former presidents Jaime Lusinchi and Virgilio Barco Vargas.  Digital Edition: 
RJV: La red de Liberales y Socialdemócratas. (RJV: Liberals and Social Democrats network) in "Ramón J. Velásquez. Estudios sobre una trayectoria al servicio de Venezuela". (Caracas, Universidad Metropolitana - Universidad de los Andes-Núcleo Táchira, 2003)
Frontera en Tiempos de Globalización: El proyecto ZIF. (Border in times of globalization: the ZIF project) (Revista Venezolana de Economía y Ciencias Sociales, Universidad Central de Venezuela, Vol. 9, No.1, enero-abril  2003)
La Paz Ramónica. (The Ramónica peace. Diary of a transitional Government in Venezuela). (Caracas, Editorial Pomaire, 1994) 
Eustoquio. (Biography of :es:Eustoquio Gómez).  (Caracas, Editorial Pomaire, 1993. Second Edition)

La Frontera Occidental Venezolana: Un análisis tendencial (The border West of Venezuela: A trend analysis). In "La Frontera Occidental Venezolana. Propuestas de Política". (Coauthor). (Caracas, Comisión Presidencial para Asuntos Fronterizos Colombo-Venezolanos, 1992)

El Estado venezolano en la era del Pac-Man: La política informática del Estado venezolano. (The Venezuelan State in the era of Pac-Man) In "27 Temas sobre Venezuela". (Caracas, Ediciones del Congreso de la República, 1988)
 París Mayo Junio 1968.(Mérida, Colección La Senda y El Surco. Facultad de Economía. Universidad de los Andes, 1980)

External links
 Twitter page Ecotalvora
 Edgar C. Otálvora Foro "Quo Vadis Venezuela" at  Interamerican Institute for Democracy.  Miami September,  2019. Video

References 

1959 births
Living people
People from Tovar, Mérida
20th-century Venezuelan historians
Venezuelan journalists
Venezuelan male writers
21st-century Venezuelan historians